Stella (or Estela) Inda (June 28, 1924 – December 7, 1995) was a Mexican film actress. She was the star of notable Mexican films, including Los olvidados by Luis Buñuel in 1949.

Biography
Inda started her career as extra in the successful film La Mujer del Puerto (1934), which starred Andrea Palma. Also, she participated in Mexican films such as The Night of the Mayas (1939), Santa (second sound version, 1943), Bugambilia (1944, with Dolores del Río), Amok (1945, with María Félix), and the success films Los olvidados (1949, directed by Luis Buñuel and El Rebozo de Soledad (1955, directed by Roberto Gavaldón). In the later years, she was an acting teacher in the Instituto Nacional de Bellas Artes in Mexico, and directed a folkloric dance group called "Stella Inda y su Conjunto".

In 1947 she had a prominent but uncredited role as the historical personage La Malinche in the Hollywood epic Captain from Castile, opposite Cesar Romero as Hernán Cortés.

Partial filmography
 La Mujer del Puerto (1934)
 Mujeres sin Alma (1934)
 The Blood Stain (1937)
 The Night of the Mayas (1939)
 Santa (1943)
 The Escape (1944)
 Bugambilia (1944)
 Amok (1945)
 Tragic Wedding (1946)
 Captain from Castile (1947)
 Los olvidados (1949)
 El Rebozo de Soledad (1952)
 The Aztec Mummy (1957)
 Fé, Esperanza y Caridad (1973)

External links

1924 births
1995 deaths
Ariel Award winners
20th-century Mexican actresses
Mexican film actresses
Actresses from Michoacán
People from Pátzcuaro